Marimekko Oyj is a Finnish textiles, clothing, and home furnishings company founded by Viljo and Armi Ratia in Helsinki in 1951. Marimekko made important contributions to fashion in the 1960s. It is particularly noted for its brightly colored printed fabrics and simple styles, used both in women's garments and in home furnishings.

Two designers in particular, Vuokko Nurmesniemi, with bold stripes, and Maija Isola, with large simple flowered prints such as the Unikko poppy, created hundreds of distinctive patterns and helped to make Marimekko a household name across the world.

Etymology
The co-founder, Armi Ratia, first considered Armi as the company's name, but it was already registered. Her middle name was Maria, shortened to Mari; her husband Viljo thought of different names for women's clothing. In her home town of Koivisto, Armi heard people talking about dresses, and so she came to the name Marimekko.

History

Foundation 

Marimekko was founded in 1951 by Viljo and Armi Ratia, after the Viljo's oil-cloth factory project failed and was converted to a garment plant. Armi asked some artist friends to apply their graphic designs to textiles.  To show how the fabric could be used, the company then designed and sold a line of simple dresses using their fabric.  When Finland's leading industrial designer Timo Sarpaneva invited the company to present a fashion show (albeit canceled at short notice) at the 1957 Triennale in Milan, it was an early recognition of fashion as an industrial art and of Marimekko's key role in shaping it to that point. The garments were eventually showcased in the nearby Rinascente upscale department store by display manager Giorgio Armani.

Pioneering design 
Two pioneering designers set the tone for Marimekko: Vuokko Nurmesniemi in the 1950s and Maija Isola in the 1960s. Nurmesniemi designed the simply striped red and white Jokapoika shirt in 1956. Isola designed the iconic Unikko (poppy) print pattern in 1964. Marimekko's bold fabrics and bright, simple design strongly influenced late 20th-century taste. Many of the early Marimekko designs, including Isola's Unikko, remain in production in the 2010s.

Commercial growth 
Marimekko spread to America in the 1960s. It was introduced to the United States by the architect Benjamin C. Thompson, who featured them in his Design Research stores. They were made famous in the United States by future first lady Jacqueline Kennedy, who bought eight Marimekko dresses which she wore throughout the 1960 United States presidential campaign.

By 1965, the company employed over 400 staff, and the company was in every aspect of fine design, from fabrics to toys and dinnerware. The firm even completely equipped small houses with furnishings. In 1985, the company was sold to Amer-yhtymä. In the early 1990s, Marimekko was in a bad financial condition and close to bankruptcy. It was bought from Amer by Kirsti Paakkanen, who introduced new business methods in the company and helped to revive its popularity.

Later in the 1990s Marimekko achieved publicity in the hit TV series Sex and the City. The fictional main character of the series, sex-and-relationship columnist Carrie Bradshaw, wore a Marimekko bikini on season 2 and then a Marimekko dress. In season 5 the series introduced tablecloths with Marimekko prints.

In 2005, Marimekko's revenue had quadrupled since Paakkanen's purchase, and its net income had grown 200-fold. Paakkanen remained CEO of Marimekko and owned 20% of the company via her business Workidea. In 2007, Paakkanen announced she would gradually hand over her ownership to Mika Ihamuotila as CEO and biggest owner of the company. By 2011 there were 84 stores across the world.

Marimekko products are made in China, India, Thailand, Portugal, Lithuania and other countries. Fabrics are printed in Marimekko's textile factory in Helsinki, but are not made in Finland.

Logo 
The logo of Marimekko has been in use since 1954. Armi Ratia wanted the logo to be simple and timeless. Graphic designer Helge Mether-Borgström used modified versions of classic Olivetti typewriter letters to create the logo.

Reception 
Cindy Babski wrote in the New York Times that "There was never any doubt about what the inside label would say. The clothes and fabrics, with their striking design and splashes of bold color, were clearly Marimekko. But for people of a certain generation—those who came of age in the 1960s—they represented more than just a brand name: They conjured up an image and an era."

In 2007, Heidi Avellan wrote in the Swedish newspaper Sydsvenskan that Marimekko was no longer a "statement, just as T-shirts with revolutionary Che Guevara or Palestinian scarves rarely express any political awareness. Marimekko is paper napkins and rubber boots". She wrote that Marimekko "began with the colourfully striped shirt, Jokapoika which Vuokko Nurmesniemi designed in 1956", which became the symbol for new radicalism in academia.

References

Citations

Bibliography
 
  (6 page-sized illustrations of Isola's prints)  Google Books

Further reading

External links 
 

Finnish design
Fashion design
Clothing companies of Finland
Clothing brands
Finnish brands
High fashion brands
Manufacturing companies based in Helsinki
Design companies established in 1951
Manufacturing companies established in 1951
Companies listed on Nasdaq Helsinki
Eyewear brands of Finland
Finnish companies established in 1951